Marc Levy is a prominent journalist in Pennsylvania, working for the Associated Press.

In 2008, the political website PolitickerPA.com named him one of the "Most Powerful Political Reporters" in Pennsylvania.

References

Living people
Pennsylvania political journalists
American newspaper reporters and correspondents
Associated Press reporters
Year of birth missing (living people)